Michael Robert Henrion Posner (born February 12, 1988) is an American rapper, singer, songwriter, and record producer. He released his debut album, 31 Minutes to Takeoff, in 2010. The album includes the US Billboard Hot 100 top 10 single "Cooler than Me" as well as the top 20 single "Please Don't Go". In 2016 he released his second album, At Night, Alone. A remix of his 2015 single "I Took a Pill in Ibiza" from the album peaked in the top 10 on the charts in 27 countries around the world, including hitting number one in many and the top five on the Billboard Hot 100 in the United States.

Posner has also written songs for a great number of fellow artists. In 2017, Posner released his first book of poetry, Tear Drops & Balloons. He is also a member of the alternative hip-hop and R&B duo Mansionz with blackbear.

Early life
Michael Robert Henrion Posner was born on February 12, 1988, in Detroit, Michigan. He was raised in Southfield, Michigan, a northern suburb of Detroit. He has a sister who is six years older. His father was Jewish and his mother is Catholic. Posner went to Bingham Farms Elementary School, Berkshire Middle School and graduated from Groves High School, where he ran varsity track and cross-country. He attended Duke University, where he was a member of Sigma Nu fraternity. He graduated with a B.A. in Sociology with a 3.6 GPA.

Posner's father, Jon, a criminal defense lawyer, died on January 11, 2017; his mother is Roberta Henrion; and his sister, Emily Henrion Posner, is a civil rights attorney.

Career

2008–2010: 31 Minutes to Takeoff

Posner started out as a record producer, working on some tracks with his hometown friend Big Sean. Posner's second mixtape, A Matter of Time (the first mixtape being Reflections of a Lost Teen) started attracting industry attention in 2009. Working with Don Cannon and DJ Benzi, the mixtape was recorded at Duke University in March 2009 under the name, "Mike Posner & the Brain Trust", the Brain Trust referring to Posner's supporters. The release was unusual for being distributed for free through iTunes U, a channel designed for educational audio content. Although Posner was not the only artist to take advantage of this loophole, his release was the most organized and high profile, and attracted the largest response, immediately reaching the number one position on the iTunes U chart. Posner signed a record deal with J Records (RCA/Sony) in July 2009, after his Junior year at Duke University. He chose to return to Duke after signing, and toured on the weekends while at the same time recording for his debut album.

Posner's third mixtape One Foot Out the Door was released in October 2009. The mixtape was accompanied by a web series of the same name which aired bi-weekly from September to December. Posner's debut album, 31 Minutes to Takeoff was released in August 2010. The first single, "Cooler Than Me" has reached at number 6 on the US Billboard Hot 100. He performed at music festival Bonnaroo and on the 2010s Warped Tour. The second and third singles, "Please Don't Go" and "Bow Chicka Wow Wow" reached the top 20 and 30 on the Hot 100 respectively. The latter was released with an added verse by rapper Lil Wayne. Posner won a 2011's ASCAP Award from the publishing organization for "Cooler Than Me". On October 7, 2011, RCA Music Group announced it was disbanding J Records along with Arista Records and Jive Records. With the shutdown, Posner (and all other artists previously signed to these three labels) will release his future material on the RCA Records brand.

2011–2014: The Layover and canceled albums
After the release of his debut album, he began working on his second studio album under the title Sky High and released the single "Looks Like Sex" to digital outlets on December 2, 2011. As a prelude to the release of the album, Posner released his third mixtape, The Layover. However, with the success of his first album, Posner began to feel uncomfortable with being in the spotlight and struggled with depression. He took a break from making music to write and produce songs for other artists. Posner later announced via Twitter that his next upcoming album would be titled Pages and would be released in early June or late Summer 2013. His single "The Way It Used To Be" premiered on digital outlets on June 11, 2013. In September 2013, it was announced that he had filmed a music video for his new single "Top of the World" which would appear on his upcoming Page 1 EP, set for release in October. The song was originally used for a Reebok campaign, and made available as a free download under the title "Tapada World" as a special remix. The song was released on December 17, 2013, featuring Big Sean, and the music video on December 19.

On March 4, 2014, Posner announced his Unplugged tour. Running seven dates in the major US markets, the tour highlighted music new and old from Posner's discography, including some new material from Pages, while also giving fans a shot at learning new information from him through the stories and Q&A sessions interspersed with the tunes. The unplugged sets featured little more than Posner on predominantly acoustic instruments, save for the potential live production on "a song or two"—much like, he says, how much of his music starts. Posner began the tour on March 31 at the World Cafe in Philadelphia, wrapping up on April 10 at Los Angeles' The Mint. The string of dates also included a hometown show in Posner's native Detroit, his first such show, he says, in around two years. In an interview with Billboard, Mike revealed that he had signed with Island Records and that Pages would be replaced with another project. He also stated that he would like to let the world hear his recordings from Sky High and Pages.

2015–present: At Night, Alone, Mansionz, A Real Good Kid, and The Walk Across America
On April 15, 2015, Posner released a stripped-down single, "I Took a Pill in Ibiza", on his Vevo account. The song was shared in an exclusive EP titled The Truth that Posner made available to fans through his email sign up list. He later confirmed that the EP would be made available to purchase from online retailers on June 22. In addition, Posner stated that his second studio album would be released after the EP.

"I Took a Pill in Ibiza" was then remixed by Norwegian production duo SeeB, whose version of the song has gathered over one billion streams on Spotify and a charting position of two on the Global Top 50 Chart and five on the USA Top 50 Chart. The SeeB remix topped the charts in the Netherlands, Ireland, Norway, the United Kingdom, and the Dance/Mix Show Airplay of American Billboard, and peaked within the top ten of the charts in Australia, Austria, Canada, Denmark, Finland, New Zealand, Sweden, Switzerland, and the United States.

On December 18, 2015, a remix EP of The Truth was released. It featured SeeB's remix of "I Took a Pill in Ibiza", as well as a remix by JordanXL of the single "Be As You Are". Then, on March 17, 2016, Mike Posner announced his second album, At Night, Alone., which was released on May 6, 2016, and featured both originals and remixes of "I Took a Pill in Ibiza" and "Be As You Are". David Jeffries of AllMusic noted an improvement for Posner in the album, writing "this might not yet be the ultimate showcase for his talents, but At Night, Alone is both a welcome return and a significant step forward." On February 17, 2017, Posner announced that the third single from the album would be a remix by American electronic duo Grey of Posner's song "In the Arms of a Stranger".

2017 also saw Posner exploring new ground. Not only did he release a book of poetry, Teardrops and Balloons, on March 17, but he also put out a new collaboration with American singer blackbear under the name Mansionz. A soulful hip hop project with spoken word influence, the song was a collaboration with rapper Spark Master Tape titled "Stfu". Mansionz is currently signed to Island Records and has released three singles, "Stfu" (featuring Spark Master Tape), "Rich White Girls", and "Dennis Rodman" (featuring Dennis Rodman). The duo's self-titled debut full-length album was released on March 24, 2017, and featured appearances from Soren Bryce, G-Eazy, Cyhi The Prynce, Snooze God, Spark Master Tape, and Dennis Rodman.

Mike Posner was featured on Nick Jonas' 2017 single "Remember I Told You", the second collaboration between Posner and Jonas. The track also featured English singer Anne-Marie. On January 22, 2018, Posner announced a poetry album entitled I was born in detroit on a very, very, very, very, very, very, very cold day, which was released on January 26, 2018. In September 2018, Posner released "Song About You", the lead single from his third studio album, A Real Good Kid. The album was released on January 18, 2019.

He released his fourth mixtape Keep Going on October 9, 2019, to commemorate his trek across the country. On December 18, 2020, Posner released his fourth studio album, a rap-opera type album titled Operation: Wake Up.

Personal life
On January 4, 2019, Posner announced that starting on March 1, 2019, he would begin a walk across America, with a support tour bus, indicating that the journey would take "most of my 31st year." Posner subsequently received a significant amount of press and fandom surrounding the walk, including an interview on CBS This Morning. On April 15, 2019, Posner set out from Asbury Park, New Jersey to begin the 3,000+ mile trip across the country. On August 7, his walk was delayed a few weeks after he was bitten by a rattlesnake in Colorado and airlifted to a local hospital. He finished his walk across America on October 18, 2019, in Venice Beach, Los Angeles, California.

On March 6, 2020, Posner endorsed Bernie Sanders for president in the 2020 Democratic Party presidential primaries.

In May 2021, Posner traveled to Nepal despite a US State Department travel advisory warning people of a massive COVID-19 outbreak in the country. In Nepal, he traveled to the base camp of Mount Everest and sang for climbers in the midst of a localized COVID-19 outbreak at base camp. In June 2021, Posner summited Mount Everest with a team composed of guide Jon Kedrowski, Dawa Chirring Sherpa and Dawa Dorje Sherpa.

Discography

 A Matter of Time (2009)
 31 Minutes to Takeoff (2010)
 At Night, Alone. (2016)
 A Real Good Kid (2019)
 Keep Going (2019)
 Operation: Wake Up (2020)

Concert tours

Headlining
 Warped Tour (2010)
 Up in the Air Tour (2010)
 The Layover Tour (2011–12)
 Unplugged Tour (2014)
 The Legendary Mike Posner Band Tour (2015–17)

Promotional
 European Tour (2011)
 MTVU VMA Tour (2011)

Opening act
Believe Tour  (2013)
Warrior Tour  (2013)
Future Now Tour  (2016)

Awards and nominations

References

External links

 
 
 Recording Institute of Detroit Home Page

1988 births
Living people
21st-century American male singers
21st-century American rappers
Alternative hip hop musicians
American dance musicians
American hip hop singers
American male pop singers
American male rappers
American male singer-songwriters
American summiters of Mount Everest
Duke University Trinity College of Arts and Sciences alumni
J Records artists
People from Southfield, Michigan
Pop rappers
RCA Records artists
Singers from Detroit
Singer-songwriters from Michigan